The Chitpavan Brahmin or Konkanastha Brahmin is a Hindu Maharashtrian Brahmin community inhabiting Konkan, the coastal region of the state of Maharashtra. Initially working as messengers and spies in the late seventeenth century, the community came into prominence during the 18th century when the heirs of Peshwa from the Bhat family of Balaji Vishwanath became the de facto rulers of the Maratha empire. Until the 18th century, the Chitpavans were held in low esteem by the Deshastha, the older established Brahmin community of Maharashtra region.

As per Jayant Lele, the influence of the Chitpavans in the Peshwa era as well as the British era has been greatly exaggerated because even during the time of the most prominent Peshwas, their political legitimacy and their intentions were not trusted by all levels of the administration, not even by Shivaji's successors. He adds that after the defeat of Peshwas in the Anglo-Mahratta wars, Chitpavans were the one of the Hindu communities to flock to western education in the Bombay Province of British India.

Origin 
The Chittapavans are also known as Konkanastha Brahmin.

The etymology of their name is given in the chapter citpāvanabrāhmaṇotpattiḥ i.e. “Origin of the Citpāvan brahmins” in the Hindu Sanskrit scripture Sahyadrikhanda of the Skanda Purana. According to this chapter, Parashurama, who could not find any Brahmins in Konkan, found sixty fishermen who had gathered near a funeral pyre near the ocean shore. These sixty fishermen families were purified and Sanksritized to Brahminhood. Since the funeral pyre is called Chitta and pure as pavana, the community was henceforth known by the name Chittapavan  or "purified at the location of a funeral pyre". However, 'Chitta' also means 'mind' in Sanskrit and the Chittapavans prefer "pure of mind" instead of "pure from the pyre". Later Parshuram was displeased with their actions. S.A. Joglekar believes that the text was added to Sahyadrikhanda to denigrate Chittapavans by those who envied them. Deshpande states that Gajanan Gaitonde intentionally left some parts untranslated and omitted some parts completely in his Marathi translation of the scripture due to its offensive nature. The Kulavruttanta of the Khare (Chitpavan) family prefers a modified version of the scripture. They state that fourteen dead-bodies were purified by Parshurama. Since "Chiplun pleased Paraśurāma’s heart", the Brahmins of that place received the name cittapāvana. The scriptures were also referred to in a 20th-century case related to the Veerashaiva rights to perform Rudra-abhishek. Bairy, a modern scholar on caste and sociology quotes a statement made by Viroopaksha Pandita on the Chitpavans non-Brahmin or non-Dvija origin by citing their scriptures.  The successful argument was made by him during Shastrartha and was regarding Brahmin purity and was cited in Nanjundaradhya(1969). The opposing side, headed by Mr.Bapat was unable to argue the case – as reported by the Star of Mysore.

The Chitpavan story of shipwrecked people is similar to the legendary arrival of Bene Israel Jews in the Raigad district. According to the historian Roshen Dalal, similarities between the legends may be due to a connection between the Chitpavans and the Bene Israel communities. Historian Jadunath Sarkar agrees with the non-Indian origin and bases his views on "traditions and inscriptions".

The Konkan region witnessed the immigration of groups, such as the Bene Israel, and Kudaldeshkars. Each of these settled in distinct parts of the region and there was little mingling between them. The Chitpavans were apparently the last major community to arrive there and consequently the area in which they settled, around Ratnagiri, was the least fertile and had few good ports for trading. The other groups generally took up trade as their primary occupation. In ancient times, the Chitpavans were employed as messengers and spies. Later, with the rise of the Chitpavan Peshwa in the 18th century they began migrating to Pune and found employment as military men, diplomats and clerks in the administration. A 1763–4 document shows that at least 67% of the clerks at the time were Chitpavans.

History

Rise during the Maratha rule 

Very little is known of the Chitpavans before 1707 CE Balaji Vishwanth Bhat, a Chitpavan arrived from Ratnagiri to the Pune-Satara area. He was brought there on the basis of his reputation of being an efficient administrator. He quickly gained the attention of Chhatrapati Shahu. Balaji's work so pleased the Chhatrapati that he was appointed the Peshwa or Prime Minister in 1713. He ran a well-organized administration and, by the time of his death in 1720, he had laid the groundwork for the expansion of the Maratha Empire. Since this time until the fall of the Maratha Empire, the seat of the Peshwa would be held by the members of the Bhat family.

With the ascension of Balaji Baji Rao and his family to the supreme authority of the Maratha Empire, Chitpavan immigrants began arriving en masse from the Konkan to Pune where the Peshwa offered all important offices to his fellow caste members. The Chitpavan kin were rewarded with tax relief and grants of land. Historians cite nepotism and corruption as causes of the fall of the Maratha Empire in 1818. Richard Maxwell Eaton states that this rise of the Chitpavans is a classic example of social rank rising with political fortune.

British Era 

After the fall of the Maratha Empire in 1818, the Chitpavans lost their political dominance to the British. The British would not subsidise the Chitpavans on the same scale that their caste-fellow, the Peshwas, had done in the past. Pay and power was now significantly reduced. Poorer Chitpavan students adapted and started learning English because of better opportunities in the British administration. 
As per the 1901 census, about 5% of the Pune population was Brahmin and about 27% of them were Chitpavans.

Some of the prominent figures in the Hindu reform movements of the 19th and 20th centuries came from the Chitpavan Brahmin community. These included Dhondo Keshav Karve, Justice Mahadev Govind Ranade, Vinayak Damodar Savarkar, Gopal Ganesh Agarkar, Vinoba Bhave.

Some of the strongest resistance to change came from the very same community. The vanguard and the old guard clashed many times. D. K. Karve was ostracised. Even Tilak offered penance for breaking caste or religious rules. One was for taking tea at Poona Christian mission in 1892 and the second was going to England in 1919.

When the social reformer Jyotirao Phule was trying to get the backward castes educated, the Chitpavans of Pune did not allow any backward and Dalit student to join existing schools. This opposition from them resulted in Phule establishing schools in and around Pune.

The Chitpavan community includes two major politicians in the Gandhian tradition: Gopal Krishna Gokhale, whom Mahatma Gandhi acknowledged as a preceptor, and Vinoba Bhave, one of his outstanding disciples. Gandhi describes Bhave as the "jewel of his disciples", and recognised Gokhale as his political guru. However, strong opposition to Gandhi came from the Chitpavan community. Vinayak Damodar Savarkar, the founder of the Hindu nationalist political ideology Hindutva, was a Chitpavan Brahmin and several other Chitpavans were among the first to embrace it because they thought it was a logical extension of the legacy of the Peshwas and caste-fellow Tilak. These Chitpavans felt out of place with the Indian social reform movement of Phule and the mass politics of Gandhi. Large numbers of the community looked to Savarkar, the Hindu Mahasabha and finally the RSS., drew their inspiration from fringe groups in this reactionary trend.

Anti-Brahmin violence in the 20th century

Shahu of Kolhapur
During the early 20th century, Bal Gangadhar Tilak's  and the Shankaracharya's decision to deny access to vedic rituals to the Maratha caste led to a fall out between Tilak and Shahu of Kolhapur. Shahu started a newspaper that supported the British and was also anti-Brahmin in its agenda. This propaganda led to great violence against Brahmins in Kolhapur.

Mahatma Gandhi's assassination
After Mahatma Gandhi's assassination by Nathuram Godse, a Chitpavan, Brahmins in Maharashtra, became targets of violence, mostly by members from the Maratha caste. The motivating factor for the violence was the love for Gandhi on the part of the rioters. The total monetary loss has been estimated to Rs.100 million (or about 20 million in 1948 US dollars).

The violence after the assassination affected chitpavan Patwardhan family ruled princely states such as Sangli, where the Marathas were joined by the Jains and the Lingayats in the attacks against the Brahmins. Here, specifically, the loss was about Rs.16 million. This event led to the hasty integration of the Patwardhan states into the Bombay Province by March 1948 – a move that was opposed by other Brahmins as they feared the Maratha predominance in the integrated province.

Military 

The Chitpavans have considered themselves to be both warriors and priests. Their involvement in military affairs began with the rise of the Peshwas and their willingness to enter military and other services earned them high status and power in the Deccan.

Culture 

In their original home of Konkan, their primary occupation was farming, while some earned money by performing rituals among their own caste members.

Anthropologist Donald Kurtz writes that the late 20th century opinions about the culture of the Chitpavans was that they were frugal to the point of appearing cheap, impassive, not trustworthy and also conspiratorial. According to Tilak, a Chitpavan himself, his community was known for cleanliness and being industrious but he suggested they should learn virtues such as benevolence and generosity from the Deshasthas.  During the heyday of the Maratha Empire, the city of Pune became the financial metropolis of the empire with 150 big and petty moneylenders. Most of these were Chitpavan or Deshastha Brahmins.

D.L.Sheth, the former director of the Center for the Study of Developing Societies in India (CSDS), lists Indian communities that were traditionally "urban and professional" (following professions like doctors, lawyers, teachers, engineers, etc.) immediately after Independence in 1947. This list included Chitpavans and CKPs(Chandraseniya Kayastha Prabhus) from Maharashtra; the South Indian Brahmins; the Nagar Brahmins from Gujarat; the Punjabi Khatris, Kashmiri Pandits and Kayasthas from northern India; the Probasi and the Bhadralok Bengalis; the Parsis and the upper crusts of Muslim and Christian communities. According to P.K.Verma, "Education was a common thread that bound together this pan Indian elite" and almost all male  members of these communities could read and write English and were educated beyond school.

Language 

The historical language of the Chitpavans was primarily Chitpavani/Chitpavani. Though now,  Chitpavan Brahmins in Maharashtra speak Marathi as their language. The Marathi spoken by Chitpavans in Pune is the standard form of language used all over Maharashtra today. This form has many words derived from Sanskrit and retains the Sanskrit pronunciation of many, misconstrued by non-standard speakers as "nasalised pronunciation".

Social status 

Earlier, the Deshastha Brahmins openly disparaged the Chitpavans as parvenus (a relative newcomer to a socio-economic class), and in Kumar's words "barely fit to associate on terms of equality with the noblest of the Dvijas". The Deshastha Brahmins were also joined by the Karhade Brahmins who also showed disdain for the Chitpawans and both these castes even declined to eat food together with them. Thus, they did not treat them as social equals. Even the Peshwas themselves were not given access to the ghats reserved for Deshastha priests at Nashik on the Godavari river.

After the appointment of Balaji Vishwanath Bhat as Peshwa, Konkanastha migrants began arriving en masse from the Konkan to Pune, where the Peshwa offered some important offices to the Konkanastha caste. The Konkanastha kin were rewarded with tax relief and grants of land. Historians point out nepotism and corruption during this time.

The rise in prominence of the Chitpavans compared to the Deshastha Brahmins resulted in intense rivalry between the two communities. 19th century records also mention Gramanyas or village-level debates between the Chandraseniya Kayastha Prabhus and the Chitpavans, Saraswat Brahmins and the Chitpavans, Pathare Prabhus and the Chitpavans and Shukla Yajurvedi Deshastha Brahmins and the Chitpavans. These disputes pertaining to the so-called violation of "Brahmanical ritual code of behavior" were quite common in Maharashtra during that period.

Bal Gangadhar Tilak believed that the Deshasthas, Chitpavans and Karhades should get united. As early as 1881, he encouraged this by writing comprehensive discussions on the urgent need for these three Maharashtrian Brahmin sub-castes to give up caste exclusiveness by intermarrying and dining together.

Starting in the 20th century, the relations between the Deshastha Brahmins and the Chitpavan Brahmins have improved by the large-scale mixing of both communities on social, financial and educational fields, as well as with intermarriages.

Diet
Traditionally, Chitpavan Brahmins are vegetarian. Rice was their staple food.

Bodan

A.J.Agarkar describes Bodan as follows and adds that some kind of dancing is also involved:

Genealogy 

The community has published several family history and genealogy almanacs called Kulavruttantas. These books usually document various aspects of a clan's history, name etymology, ancestral land holdings, migration maps, religious traditions, genealogical charts, biographies, and records of births, deaths and marriages within the clan.

Notable people 
Peshwa Balaji Vishwanath and his descendants, Bajirao I, Chimaji Appa, Balaji Bajirao, Raghunathrao, Sadashivrao Bhau, Madhavrao I, Narayanrao, Madhavrao II, and Bajirao II
Nana Fadnavis (1742–1800), regent to Madhavrao II
The Patwardhans, military leaders under the Peshwa and later rulers of various princely states
Balaji Pant Natu, spied for the British against the Peshwa era Maratha Empire and raised the Union Jack over Shaniwar Wada.
Lokhitwadi (Gopal Hari Deshmukh) (1823–1892), social reformer
Nana Sahib (1824–1859), adopted heir of the deposed Peshwa Bajirao II and one of the main leaders of the Indian Rebellion of 1857
Vishnubawa Brahmachari (1825–1871), 19th-century Marathi Hindu revivalist
Mahadev Govind Ranade (1842–1901), judge and social reformer. Given the title of Rao Bahadur.
Vishnushastri Krushnashastri Chiplunkar (1850–1882), essayist, editor of Nibandha Mala, a Marathi journal, educator, mentor to Bal Gangadhar Tilak and Gopal Ganesh Agarkar, founder of the Chitrashala press
Vasudev Balwant Phadke (1845–1883), a petty government clerk in Pune who led an armed rebellion against the British. Later an Educator.
Bal Gangadhar Tilak (1856–1920), educator, writer and early nationalist leader with widespread appeal. Described by British colonial administration as the "Father of Indian Unrest"
Gopal Ganesh Agarkar (1856 – June 1895), journalist, educator and social reformer
Keshavsut (Krishnaji Keshav Damle) (15 March 1866 – 7 November 1905), Marathi-language poet
Dhondo Keshav Karve (1858–1962), social reformer and advocate of women's education
Anandibai Joshi (1865–1887), first Indian woman to get a medical degree from a university in the west – Woman's Medical College of Pennsylvania – in 1886
Gopal Krishna Gokhale (1866–1915), early nationalist leader on the moderate wing of the Congress party
Ramabai Mahadev Ranade (1862–1925), woman social acitivist, reformer, founder of Seva Sadan Pune and wife of Justice Mahadev Govind Ranade
Chapekar brothers (1873–1899), (1879–1899), brothers who assassinated British plague commissioner Walter Rand for his heavy-handed approach to plague relief in Pune in 1897
Gangadhar Nilkanth Sahasrabuddhe, a social reformer, who, along with two other reformers – Chairman Surendranath Tipnis of the Mahad Municipality and A. V. Chitre – helped Ambedkar during the Mahad Satyagraha
Narasimha Chintaman Kelkar (1872–1947), writer, journalist, nationalist leader. served on the Viceroy's Executive Council (1924–29).
Aditya J Patwardhan, Indian film director, producer, and scriptwriter
Ganesh Damodar Savarkar (1879–1945), founder of the Abhinav Bharat Society, independence activist and brother of Vinayak Damodar Savarkar
Vinayak Damodar Savarkar (28 May 1883 – 26 February 1966), freedom fighter, social reformer and formulator of the Hindutva philosophy. Popularly known as Veer Savarkar ("Brave" Savarkar)
Senapati Bapat (12 November 1880 – 28 November 1967), prominent Indian freedom fighter who acquired title of Senapati, meaning "Commander"
Dadasaheb Phalke (30 April 1870 – 16 February 1944), pioneer of Indian film industry
Krushnaji Prabhakar Khadilkar (25 November 1872 – 26 August 1948), editor of Kesari and Navakal
Vishnu Narayan Bhatkhande (1860–1936), eminent maestro of Hindustani classical music
Vishwanath Kashinath Rajwade (1863–1926), historian
Pandurang Vaman Kane (1880–1972), Indologist and Bharat Ratna awardee
Anant Laxman Kanhere (1891–1910), Indian nationalist and revolutionary, hanged for the assassination of British Collector of Nashik, A. M. T. Jackson in 1910
Vinoba Bhave (1895–1982), Gandhian leader and freedom fighter
Dattatreya Ramachandra Bendre (1896–1981), poet and writer in the Kannada language. Winner of the Jnanpith Award
Narhar Vishnu Gadgil (10 January 1896 – 12 January 1966), Congress leader and Member of Nehru's cabinet
Irawati Karve (1905–1970), anthropologist
Nathuram Godse (19 May 1910 – 15 November 1949), Mahatma Gandhi's assassin
Narayan Apte (1911–1949) – co-conspirator in the assassination of Gandhi
Gopal Godse (1919–2005) – co-conspirator in the assassination of Gandhi and Nathuram Godse's younger brother
Ramachandra Dattatrya Ranade (1886–1956) was an Indian philosopher, spiritual leader, and social revolutionary
Pandurang Shastri Athavale (1920–2003) was an Indian activist philosopher, spiritual leader, social revolutionary and religion reformist who founded the Swadhyaya Parivar (Swadhyaya Family) in 1954
Kashinath Ghanekar (1930–1986) – Marathi Actor and First superstar on Marathi Stage.
Madhuri Dixit (born 1967) – Bollywood actress
Chintaman Ganesh Kolhatkar (12 March 1891 – 23 November 1959), also known as Chintamanrao Kolhatkar, was a well known Marathi stage actor, director, producer, and playwright. He was awarded *Sangeet Natak Akademi Award in 1957
Dr Ashish Kishore Lele ( Born 3rd April-1967), chemical engineer, scientist and director of the National Chemical Laboratory, Pune

See also 
 Deshastha Brahmin
 Karhade Brahmin
 Limaye
 Maharashtrian Brahmin

References 
Notes

Citations

Further reading 
 
 
 
Chitpavans under the British Raj-

External links 
 Kokanastha.com

Brahmin communities of Maharashtra
Konkani people
Brahmin communities of Goa
Social groups of Maharashtra
Marathi people
Vegetarian communities